Charles Easmon may refer to:
Macormack Charles Farrell Easmon (1890–1972), Sierra Leonean physician, historian, and scholar
Charles Odamtten Easmon (1913–1994), Ghanaian surgeon and pioneer of cardiac surgery in West Africa
Charles Syrett Farrell Easmon (born 1946), British microbiologist and medical administrator